Double Agent 73 is a 1974 exploitation movie directed and produced by Doris Wishman and starring burlesque performer Chesty Morgan.

Plot
Chesty Morgan, a woman whose bust is 73 inches in size, plays Jane Tennay, a large breasted secret agent. Her agency wants her to assassinate, one by one, an organized crew of low grade heroin pushers. In order for her to prove her killings, they plant a tiny camera in her big left breast. Each time she needs a photo taken, she takes off her shirt and clicks over her left breast.

Unlike the previous film, there's no smothering and only one death sequence involves her monstrous breasts. In it, she ambushes and ties up a guy's girlfriend in their bathroom. She then rubs poison over her own breasts and climbs into the guy's bed. Even though the light is on and disregarding the huge difference in breasts' size, the sleepy guy thinks she is his girlfriend. He starts kissing her large breasts and soon after dies from the poison.

It turns out the agency planted a time-bomb inside the camera, as an insurance policy in case she is captured. Just in the nick of time Jane has all the photos she needed and is rushed to the hospital. The camera is removed and the photos reveal Jane's love interest is the head criminal. When they meet up, he confesses and asks her to marry him. Jane responds by shooting him dead and proceeding to her next mission.

Sequels

Double Agent 73 is an ostensible sequel to Deadly Weapons, also directed by Doris Wishman.

Sources

See also
 List of American films of 1974

External links
 
 

1974 films
American sexploitation films
1970s English-language films
Films directed by Doris Wishman
1970s American films